Valin Jeq (also Romanized as Valīn Jeq; also known as Varīnjeq) is a village in Dizajrud-e Sharqi Rural District, Qaleh Chay District, Ajab Shir County, East Azerbaijan Province, Iran. At the 2006 census, its population was 509, in 115 families.

References 

Populated places in Ajab Shir County